SPAR Aerospace was a Canadian aerospace company. It produced equipment for the Canadian Space Agency to be used in cooperation with NASA's Space Shuttle program, most notably the Canadarm, a remote manipulator system.

The company went through a series of changes through mergers and acquisition activities, and is now part of MDA.

History
The company was originally formed in 1967 in Brampton, Ontario through a management buyout of de Havilland Canada’s Special Products division and Avro Canada's Applied Research unit. This provided the name Special Products/Applied Research, or SPAR for short. Special Products was best known for the construction of the Alouette 1 satellite, which made Canada the fourth spacefaring nation. The company was initially involved in spacecraft applications. Larry Clarke led the formation of the company and was its first president.

As part of the Space Shuttle program, the National Research Council of Canada agreed to take on the task of building a robot arm to equip the Shuttle's as Canada's contribution to the effort. SPAR was selected to build the system, which became known as the Canadarm. This also led to their successful 1992 bid on the Canadarm 2 for the International Space Station. The company was also the prime contractor on a number of satellites, including Anik-E, Olympus 1s (L-SAT), and Radarsat-1. However, through the 1990s the space industry underwent a period of intense consolidation and SPAR was largely locked out of the market. Further sales were not forthcoming, and the company sold the space division to Orbital Sciences in 1999, who sold it in turn to MacDonald Dettwiler in 2001 to become MD Robotics, and then again to Allianz Technosystems in 2008.

In 1992, SPAR purchased the US company ComStream, who made compression systems for telecommunications and satellites in particular. This led to massive losses in 1996 due to the division's underperformance. Their major customer, Thomson Consumer Electronics, had been waiting for ComStream to deliver a decoding chip for their direct broadcast satellite receivers, but they introduced their own designs and ComStream lost the contract. SPAR sold the division to Radyne in 1998, taking a loss of about $13 million on the purchase and sale alone.

In 1997, seeking a path to diversification, SPAR purchased CAE Aviation's aircraft maintenance operations, in Edmonton, formerly Northwest Industries. CAE Aviation had maintained the Canadian Air Force's CC-130 Hercules for several decades, including performing of the Centre Wing and Outer Wing replacement programs, Progressive Structural Inspection (PSI) program, Tanker program, Avionics Upgrade Program (AUP) and Hercules Airframe and Wiring System Refurbishment (HAWSR) programs. They also handled the complete overhaul of the Royal New Zealand Air Force's 40-year-old Lockheed C-130 Hercules aircraft.  Other customers included the Royal Norwegian Air Force, United States Coast Guard, and Greece's Hellenic Air Force. SPAR performed several avionics upgrades and a Depot Level Inspection and Repair (DLIR) for the Royal Canadian Air Force CL-41 Tutor aircraft flown by the Snowbirds acrobatic team.

The robotics division was sold in 1999 and became part of MacDonald, Dettwiler and Associates as MD Robotics, a subsidiary of its MDA Space Missions division. As part of MDA, it developed the Mobile Servicing System for the International Space Station, which includes the Space Station Remote Manipulator System, also known as Canadarm 2.

In 2001, a majority stake in the remaining operations was purchased by  L-3 Communications. L-3 managed SPAR Aerospace for years, but L-3 didn't invest in or expand the business. In 2003 it acquired Bombardier Inc.'s Military Aviation Services. In 2005 L-3 Communications SPAR Aerospace lost the DND contract to maintain CC-130E/H aircraft and SPAR had to lay off hundreds of employees. SPAR's Edmonton facilities and workforce (both the City Centre and the International Airport locations) were permanently shut down at the end of summer 2009 after over four decades of production and service. Other facilities, including Trenton, remain in use.

Facilities
 Mississauga, Ontario
 Trenton, Ontario
 Venice, Italy
 Montreal, Quebec

See also
 Bombardier Aerospace
 COM DEV International
 CMC Electronics
 Héroux-Devtek
 MacDonald, Dettwiler and Associates
 Viking Air

References

 Beckert, Beverly A., "Satellite Design Soars to New Heights", Computer-Aided Engineering, October 1993, p. 24.
 Berman, David, "When Bad Companies Happen to Good People", Canadian Business, March 27, 1998, pp. 78–81.
 Calamai, Peter, "Canada Mulls Shifting Space Contract to Europeans: U.S. Ban on Flow of Information, Technology Blamed", Toronto Star, May 29, 1999.
 Covault, Craig, "Ariane Launches Canadian MSat-1", Aviation Week and Space Technology, April 29, 1996, p. 29.
 De Santis, Solange, "In Reaching to Diversify, Spar Aerospace Loses Its Grip—New Chief at Maker of Canadarm Has Hands Full with Leftover Problems", Wall Street Journal, June 26, 1996, p. B4.
 Hubbard, Craig, "Shuttle's Canadarm Earns Its 50-Mission Cap", Computing Canada, August 10, 1998, p. 4.
 Knapp, Bill, "Masters of the Universe", Canadian Business, November 1992, pp. 119–24.
 Litvak, Isaiah A., "Instant International: Strategic Reality for Small High-Technology Firms in Canada", Multinational Business, Summer 1990, pp. 1–12.
 Morgan, Walter L., "The Olympus Family", Satellite Communications, June 1985, p. 35ff.
 Savona, Dave, and Stephen W. Quickel, "Steel's New Gleam; Sparring Partner", International Business, March 1993, p. 126.
 Southerst, John, "An Arm with a Mind of Its Own", Canadian Business, March 1992, pp. 60–64.
 "Spar Aerospace Launches New Data Collection System", Plant Engineering & Maintenance, March/April 1993, pp. 15–18.
 "The Year of Living Differently", Canadian Business, June 1997, p. 16.
 Source: International Directory of Company Histories, Vol. 32. St. James Press, 2000.

External links
 Canadian Space Agency
 L3 SPAR Aerospace Limited
 Aerospace Industries of Canada
 Light Duty Utility Arm 
 Toronto Aviation History
 Aviation History
 Avrocar
 Funding Universe - Spar Aerospace history

Aerospace companies of Canada
Space industry companies of Canada